Karan (Qaran) is a rural locality (a selo) and the administrative centre of Karansky Selsoviet, Buzdyaksky District, Bashkortostan, Russia. The population was 358 as of 2010. There are 5 streets.

Geography 
Karan is located 18 km north of Buzdyak (the district's administrative centre) by road. Uranovo is the nearest rural locality.

References 

Rural localities in Buzdyaksky District